Jesper Pilegaard (born 6 March 1964 in Elsinore) participated in the 1992 Olympic Games in Barcelona together with Hans Jorgen Riber in 470-sailing placing 19 out of 37 participants; he also participated in numerous European and World championships in sailing (including 470, Laser, and Wayfarer). 
He has been an international key account manager for Nordea as of September 2009 and Vice-Chairman of the Olympic Club of Denmark as of April 2017.

External links
http://www.olympiskklub.dk
https://www.linkedin.com/in/jesper-pilegaard-3623732/
Jesper Pilegaard at Sports Reference

Living people
Sailors at the 1992 Summer Olympics – 470
1964 births
Olympic sailors of Denmark
Danish male sailors (sport)
People from Helsingør
Sportspeople from the Capital Region of Denmark